Cannery Row is a novel by American author John Steinbeck, published in 1945. It is set during the Great Depression in Monterey, California, on a street lined with sardine canneries that is known as Cannery Row. The story revolves around the people living there: Lee Chong, the local grocer; Doc, a marine biologist; and Mack, the leader of a group of derelict people.

The actual location Steinbeck was writing about, Ocean View Avenue in Monterey, was later renamed "Cannery Row" in honor of the book. A film version was released in 1982 and a stage version was produced in 1995.

Plot
Cannery Row has a simple premise: Mack and his friends are to do something nice for their friend Doc, who has been good to them without asking for reward. Mack hits on the idea that they should throw a thank-you party, and the entire community quickly becomes involved. Unfortunately, the party rages out of control, and Doc's lab and home are ruined—and so is Doc's mood. In an effort to return to Doc's good graces, Mack and the boys decide to throw another party—but make it work this time. A procession of linked vignettes describes the denizens' lives on Cannery Row. These constitute subplots that unfold concurrently with the main plot.

Character include Lee Chong, the operator of the neighborhood grocery store, "Lee Chong's Heavenly Flower Grocery"; Doc, a marine biologist at Western Biological Laboratories, based on Steinbeck's friend Ed Ricketts, to whom Steinbeck dedicated the novel; Dora Flood, the owner and operator of the Bear Flag Restaurant; Mack, leader of a group of men called Mack and the boys; Hazel, a young man living with Mack and the boys in the Palace Flophouse; Eddie, a part-time bartender living at the Palace Flophouse, who supplies the boys with "hooch" left in patrons' glasses at Ida's Bar; and an enigmatic figure known as "the Chinaman".

Steinbeck revisited these characters and this milieu nine years later in his novel Sweet Thursday.

Major ideas

Camaraderie 

Mack and the boys work together to plan a party for Doc. After a failed first attempt, where Doc is not even present, their second attempt is more successful. Their transformation into an organised group in order to do something nice for Doc shows the value of comradeship and sociality.

Contentment 
Mack and the boys at the Palace Flophouse need little and appreciate much, and whatever they do need they acquire by cunning and oftentimes stealing. Doc is happy with his station in life and in the community (but many worry about his being lonely without a companion). Lee Chong could very easily go after the people in Cannery Row and collect on the debts he is owed, but he chooses instead to let the money come back to him gradually. "Henri the painter" is happy building his ever-changing boat and will continually dismantle it and start again so that he can continue building it. Cannery Row is content because its denizens are not ambitious to be anything other than who they are: their sole ambition is to better befriend Doc.

Prostitutes 
Steinbeck expresses a certain respect for prostitution for its honesty of motives, while reserving moral judgment for the reader. In Of Mice and Men (1937), George has a small monologue in which he states that a man can go into a whorehouse and get a beer and sex for a price agreed upon up front - unlike less professional relationships, you know what you're going to get and what you will have to pay for it. The same theme of respect is expressed in Cannery Row in Steinbeck's descriptions of the Bear Flag: prostitution is a business that provides a service in demand, it is run cleanly and honestly, and it benefits the community.

Overcoming superficial views of people
Throughout the story characters such as Dora Flood, Mack, and Doc are all expanded upon, and they reveal that they are much more complicated than they at first appear to be. For example, Dora Flood owns the brothel and is disliked by the townswomen because of her business, but she is very generous and for two years donates groceries to hungry people. Doc, who is a loved and respected member of society, is, deep down, a very sad and lonely person who, until the end of the story, never opens up to other people.

Nostalgia
The novel opens with the words: "Cannery Row in Monterey in California is a poem, a stink, a grating noise, a quality of light, a tone, a habit, a nostalgia, a dream." Author John Steinbeck spent some of the happiest years of his life in a house in Pacific Grove near "Cannery Row" and the laboratory of his friend, Ed Ricketts. This began in 1930 and lasted to 1941, when Steinbeck's marriage failed, and he fled eastward to marry again (eventually). After a traumatic time documenting the war in the Mediterranean campaign in 1943, Steinbeck returned home to find that his second marriage was also in difficulties. He wrote Cannery Row in 1944 in an attempt to recover a Depression era world in Monterey which was, by then, already inaccessible to Steinbeck. Major influences for this change included the war's effect on both Steinbeck and Monterey, the breakup of Steinbeck's first marriage, and the insulation caused by Steinbeck's new wealth arising from his increasing fame and success as a writer. Steinbeck was already beginning to suspect that he would never again be able to go back to living in this, his favorite part of California. Indeed, after a failed attempt to live in California in the late 1940s, he left to spend the rest of his life in New York.

Sweet Thursday

Steinbeck later wrote a sequel released in 1954 called Sweet Thursday, in which several new characters are introduced and Doc finds love, with the help of his friends. The film version of Cannery Row incorporates elements from both books.

Rodgers and Hammerstein adapted Sweet Thursday into a Broadway musical Pipe Dream. Because the pair were uncomfortable with the idea of their main character being a prostitute, the show's allusions to prostitution were left vague. Although the show ran for seven months, it still lost money. Still, the score is remembered fondly by many.

Adaptations

Film

A film version was released in 1982, starring Nick Nolte and Debra Winger. The screenplay was written by David S. Ward, whose other screenplay credits include The Sting and Major League.

Stage

In 1994, the Western Stage in Salinas, California, commissioned J. R. Hall to do a stage adaptation of the novel to commemorate the 50th anniversary of its publication. A year later, it was produced as part of the National Steinbeck Festival. Subsequently, it was revived by the Western Stage in 2005, by the Community College of Allegheny County in Pittsburgh, Pennsylvania, in 2007, and by The City Theatre of Sacramento, Calif. in 2014.

In popular culture 
The musician Will Oldham who began his career under the name Palace Flophouse, which was later changed to Palace and Palace Brothers, got the inspiration for his early monikers by reading Cannery Row and Sweet Thursday. 
The titles of the 1950 Tweety Bird cartoon Canary Row and the 1967 Tom and Jerry cartoon short Cannery Rodent are plays on words of this book's name.
In the South Park episode, "Do the Handicapped Go to Hell?", the two-year-old Ike Broflovski is reading Cannery Row with his parents, who then compliment him on reading two of Steinbeck's books in one day.
On November 5, 2019, the BBC News listed Cannery Row on its list of the 100 most influential novels.
The Bob Dylan song Sad-Eyed Lady of the Lowlands contains the line: "With your sheet-metal memory of Cannery Row".
Cannery Row is mentioned in the 2010 Louis Sachar novel The Cardturner.

References

External links 
 
 
 
 Gladstein, Mimi R. "Cannery Row: A Male World and the Female Reader." Steinbeck Quarterly 25.03-04 (Summer/Fall 1992): 87–97.
 Morsberger, Robert E. "Cannery Row Revisited." Steinbeck Quarterly 16.03-04 (Summer/Fall 1983): 89–95.

1945 American novels
American historical novels
American novels adapted into films
American novels adapted into plays
Great Depression novels
History of Monterey County, California
Monterey, California
Novels by John Steinbeck
Novels set in California
Viking Press books